"Island" is a song co-written and recorded by American country music artist Eddy Raven.  It was released in April 1990 as the fourth single from the album Temporary Sanity.  The song reached #10 on the Billboard Hot Country Singles & Tracks chart.  It was written by Raven and Troy Seals.

Chart performance

Year-end charts

References

1990 singles
Eddy Raven songs
Songs written by Troy Seals
Songs written by Eddy Raven
Song recordings produced by Barry Beckett
Capitol Records Nashville singles
1990 songs